District 61A is a district of the Minnesota House of Representatives covering portions of the city of Minneapolis in the Twin Cities metropolitan area including portions of the Phillips, Ventura Village, Seward, and Lyn-Lake neighborhoods.

In the Senate, the same area comprises part of District 61.

List of representatives
 Karen Clark (1993-present; formerly sitting for 59A)
 Lee Greenfield (1983-1992)
 John Brandl (1981-82)
 William Crandall (1979-80)
 John Brandl (1977-78)
 Frank Knoll (1974-76)
 Gary Flakne (1973)

Minnesota House of Representatives districts
Hennepin County, Minnesota